Ying Shao (150–203), courtesy name Zhongyuan, was a Chinese politician, writer and historian who lived during the Eastern Han dynasty. He was an author of the Fengsu Tongyi, an encyclopedic work about the folk customs and legends that existed in the Eastern Han dynasty. Ying Shao occupied official posts in the Han government, and in his official position he was an active participant in imperial politics. He was a long-time close associate of Cao Cao, and in that connection he was extensively covered in volumes 9, 35, 71 and 103 of the historical text Book of the Later Han.

Life
Ying Shao was from Nandun County, Runan Commandery, which is located west of present-day Xiangcheng, Henan. In the early 190s, Ying Shao served as the Administrator of Taishan Commandery in Xu Province. He repelled an attack on his commandery by the remnants of the Yellow Turban rebels, recorded in the Book of the Later Han. In 193 and 194, the warlord Cao Cao attacked Xu Province to seek vengeance for the murder of his father Cao Song, thus Ying Shao fled from Taishan Commandery and took refuge under Cao Cao's rival Yuan Shao. By the time Cao Cao defeated the Yuan family and conquered the Hebei region, Ying Shao was already dead. The interim events are given in two versions in Pei Songzhi's annotations to the Records of the Three Kingdoms, the Wei Jin Shiyu by Guo Song, and Wei Zhao's Book of Wu.

See also
 Lists of people of the Three Kingdoms

References

 Fan, Ye (5th century). Book of the Later Han (Houhanshu).
 .
 

Year of birth unknown
150 births
203 deaths
Chinese lexicographers
Han dynasty politicians from Henan
Han dynasty writers
Historians from Henan
Officials under Yuan Shao
Political office-holders in Shandong
Politicians from Zhoukou
Writers from Zhoukou